Peggy Scott-Adams (born Peggy Stoutmeyer, June 25, 1948) is an American blues and R&B singer. She is sometimes known by her former name of Peggy Scott, and billed as "The Little Lady with the Big Voice".

Early life and career
Peggy Stoutmeyer was born in Opp, Alabama, and grew up in Pensacola, Florida. Throughout her early career, Scott toured with Ben E. King as a teenager and hit the Top 40 three times with "Lover's Holiday" (July 1968), "Pickin' Wild Mountain Berries" (November 1968), and "Soulshake" (February 1969) as a duet act with Jo Jo Benson. All of these singles were released by SSS International Records.Not long after that, out of the music industry since the late 1960s, she was working as a lounge singer in Pensacola, Florida, until she moved to California and married Robert L. Adams Sr.

Solo career
She was then persuaded to return to the studio by singer/songwriter/producer Jimmy Lewis. With his guidance, they recorded her solo debut album, Help Yourself, released on October 22, 1996.

One of the Jimmy Lewis songs was a track about a woman complaining that her husband had romantic and sexual desires for another man. Released as a single initially just to blues radio stations, the song, "Bill", also began getting airplay on Urban contemporary radio and soon gained most-requested status at several larger stations. It peaked at #87 on the Billboard Hot 100. The music video to "Bill" also became popular. The album, "Help Yourself" began selling well, making the Billboard 200 albums chart, peaking at #72, #9 on the R&B chart and #1 on the Top Blues Albums chart.

The release of Contagious later in 1997 also featured the hit single "Spousal Abuse", which tackled the issue of domestic abuse in relationships. Her third album, Undisputed Queen, was released in 1999. She continued in 2000 with Live in Alabama & More, which featured the ballad, "When I'm With You" and the dance track "Sweaty Men". Both singles became hits. The next album was Hot & Sassy.

Recent times
Her fifth album, Busting Loose, was released in 2003. It featured the lead single, "If You Wanna Hear Me Holler, Lick Me Up Some Dollars". In 2006, she issued her first gospel album entitled God Can, And He Will. Her second gospel album, Back To The Roots, was released in 2009 on her own independent label, Nora Records.

Discography

Singles
 "Bill"
 "Slow Drag"
 "Help Yourself"
 "Spousal Abuse"
 "I'm in Love"
 "I'll Take Care of You"
 "That's How I Do It"
 "When You're Married To a Fool"
 "You Will Always Be My Man"
 "When I'm With You"
 "Sweaty Men"
 "If I'm Not Still Married"
 "Mr. Right or Mr. Wrong"
 "See You Next Weekend"
 "Your Divorce Has Been Denied"
 "What'cha Doin' to Me"
 "If You Wanna Hear Me Holler, Lick Me Up Some Dollars"
 "I Intend To Take Your Place"

Albums
1996: Help Yourself (Miss Butch/Mardi Gras Records)
1997: Contagious (Miss Butch)
1999: Undisputed Queen (Miss Butch)
2000: Live in Alabama & More (Miss Butch)
2001: Hot and Sassy (Miss Butch)
2005: Busting Loose (Miss Butch)
2006: Best Of Peggy Scott-Adams:16 Hits! (Miss Butch) 
2006: God Can, And He Will (Mardi Gras)
2009: Back To The Roots (Nora Records)
2012: Life After Bill (CD Baby)

References

See also
 Jo Jo Benson
 R&B
 Blues

External links
 Scott-Adams's official website

1948 births
Living people
American soul singers
Contemporary blues musicians
People from Opp, Alabama
21st-century African-American women singers
20th-century African-American women singers